This is a list of Members of Parliament (MPs) elected to the Islamic Consultative Assembly of Iran at the 2016 elections, held on 26 February and 29 April 2016.

List

East Azerbaijan Province districts

Gilan Province districts

Tehran Province districts

Isfahan Province districts

Yazd Province districts

Ilam Province districts

Sistan and Baluchestan Province districts

Religious minority reserved seats

See also
 List of Representatives of the Parliament of Iran

References